Pays Plat First Nation is a small First Nation reserve community located near Rossport, Ontario, Canada, about  northeast of Thunder Bay. The Pays Plat 51 Reserve is in the boundaries of the territory described in the Robinson-Superior Treaty of 1850. The community is located along Highway 17.

History 
The Ojibway people living on the North Shore of Lake Superior (ancestors of Pays Plat First Nations people) survived by hunting, trapping, fishing, and gathering food. The area was heavily involved in the fur trade, and the ancestors living near what is now called Pays Plat were key in trapping for furs. Pays Plat was named by French traders and means flat land, named after the fact that it is flat land between two mountains. In Anishinaabemowin the community is known as Baagwaashiing which means "Where the water is shallow."

Chief and Council

External links
Official Website
Pays Plat (on Highway 17) - Ontario Highway 11 Homepage

References

First Nations governments in Ontario
Ojibwe governments
Ojibwe reserves in Ontario
Communities in Thunder Bay District